The Texarkana Shine-Oners were a minor league baseball team based in Texarkana, Texas in 1906. Preceded and succeeded by 1905 and 1909 Texarkana teams without a nickname, as was common in the era, the three Texarkana teams played as members of the Class D level North Texas League in 1905, Arkansas-Texas League in 1906 and Arkansas State League in 1909. The three teams were each managed by Robert Shelton and hosted minor league home games at Texas League Park.

History
After first hosting minor league baseball with the 1897 Texarkana Nobles of the Arkansas State League, the 1902 Texarkana Casketmakers played as members of Texas League for one season.

In 1905, Texarkana fielded a team in the Class D level North Texas League, before folding during the season. Texarkana disbanded August 2, 1905 causing the league to disband August 6, 1905. Managed by Robert Shelton, Texarkana ended the 1905 season with a record of 36–46, placing fourth in the North Texas League standings in the shortened season.

Texarkana continued play the next season, as the 1906 Texarkana "Shine–Oners" became charter members of the Class D level Arkansas-Texas League. Texarkana was joined by the Camden Ouachitas, Hot Springs Vapors and Pine Bluff Barristers as the charter members of the four–team league.

The team's Shine–Oners nickname was in reference to a popular song in the era, "Shine On Harvest Moon."

The Texarkana Shine–Oners folded during the Arkansas–Texas League season. The Texarkana team disbanded August 25, 1906 with a record of 28–30 and the league was forced to fold the next day, with only three remaining teams. Robert Shelton again served as the Texarkana manager. In the shortened season, the Shine–Oners finished behind the first place Pine Bluff Barristers (32–26) and 2nd place Camden Ouachitas (29–28) and ahead of the fourth place Hot Springs Vapors (25–32) in the final standings.

After a two-season hiatus, Texarkana next hosted the 1909 "Texarkana" team of the Class D level Arkansas State League, which folded during the season. The eight–team Arkansas State League folded on July 7, 1909. Texarkana ended the Arkansas State League season with a record of 34–35, placing third in the final leagus standings, as Robert Shelton served as manager for a third time in Texarkana.

The 1912 Texarkana Twins of the Class D level South Central League were the next team hosted in Texarkana, continuing play at Texas League Park.

The ballpark
The 1905, 1906 and 1909 Texarkana teams hosted minor league home games at Texas League Park. The ballpark was built in 1905.

Timeline

Year–by–year records

Notable alumni
 Jim Gray (1906)

See also
 Texarkana (minor league baseball) players

References

External Links
Texarkana - Baseball Reference

Defunct baseball teams in Texas
Baseball teams established in 1906
Baseball teams disestablished in 1906
1906 establishments in Texas
1906 disestablishments in Texas
Defunct Arkansas-Texas League teams
Texarkana, Texas